Natalia Kałucka (born 25 December 2001) is a Polish sport climber. She competed at the 2021 IFSC Climbing World Championships, winning the gold medal in the women's speed event. Kałucka is the twin sister of Aleksandra Kałucka.

See also
List of grade milestones in rock climbing
History of rock climbing
Rankings of most career IFSC gold medals

References

External links 
 

Living people
Polish rock climbers
IFSC Climbing World Championships medalists
Sport climbers at the 2018 Summer Youth Olympics
21st-century Polish women
World Games silver medalists
Competitors at the 2022 World Games
2001 births
Sportspeople from Tarnów
Twin sportspeople
Polish twins
IFSC Climbing World Cup overall medalists
Speed climbers